The Johnson-Smith House is a historic property in DeSoto County, Florida. It is listed on the National Register of Historic Places. It is a late 19th-century two-story Folk Victorian architecture residence (c. 1892). appearance. It was added to the National Register on April 16, 2013. The home is located at 1519 North Arcadia Avenue in Arcadia, Florida.

See also
National Register of Historic Places listings in DeSoto County, Florida

References

Houses in DeSoto County, Florida
Houses on the National Register of Historic Places in Florida
National Register of Historic Places in DeSoto County, Florida